The Ilorin Emirate is a traditional state based in the city of Ilorin in Kwara State, Nigeria. It is largely populated by the Yoruba-speaking people, though the kingdom is a hybrid state due to the influence of the many other tribes that make up the city. It is one of the Banza Bakwai - or copy-cats of the legitimate Hausa Kingdoms - as a result of it being part of the Sokoto Caliphate.

History
The first settlers in Ilorin were Barubas who lived there for many years and considered the area their own; they left with no known reason. Then came Ojo Isekuse, a Yoruba hermit, who lived by the sharpening stone where hunters gathered to sharpen their wares. Ilorin was named after the sharpening stone which still exists today. Ojo Isekuse allegedly left after committing incest with his daughter, and another family named Asaju settled near the sharpening stone.
It was after the Asajus that numerous people settled in different independent hamlets around the area called Ilorin today.

At the start of the 19th century, Ilorin was in the northeast of the Oyo Empire, with substantial Yoruba, Hausa and Fulani populations.
It became the headquarters of an Oyo generalissimo, Afonja, who was a warlord whose seat was Ilorin and who later fled to avoid a suicidal war he was sent to execute at the behest of the Alaafin of Oyo. He was joined by an Islamic cleric called Shehu Alimi, who ran from Oyo because of persecution by the Ogboni cult.

Shehu Alimi and Afonja formed an alliance to fight off the advancing Oyo army and defeated the Oyo army in the first war. The Alaafin decided to send a larger force that was sure to quench Afonja's rebellion and eliminate the cleric, Shehu Alimi, who provided military support by inviting the Jama'a. The Jama'a and Afonja's forces launched a preemptive attack on Oyo-Ile, the capital of the old Oyo Empire, and burnt it down.
 
Ilorin became a major political and military force after the fall of old Oyo. With no named leader, both Afonja and Alimi provided leadership for the people living in that area. Afonja and Salih Janta, also called Shehu Alimi, enjoyed a cordial relationship until Alimi's demise at a ripe old age. 

After Shehu Alimi's demise, there was a tussle for the rulership of Ilorin, a young and burgeoning town. The alfas wanted to establish an Islamic Caliphate based on knowledge, while Afonja was planning on re-establishing his absolute rule, but Abdulsalam emerged with the help of his warriors. They had firm control of the Jama'a which was the largest military presence in Ilorin.
Afonja was killed during the reign of Abdulsalam when a brawl broke out between the Yoruba forces and Jama'a caused by the masquerade of Afonja. The Yoruba religion and Egungun were banned in Ilorin because of that incident.
Ilorin became an emirate of the Sokoto Caliphate.

For some time, Ilorin was a major center of the slave trade. In the past, slaves had mainly been sent north across the Sahara, but now they were being sent south via the Yoruba lands to the coast to supply demand from the US, the West Indies, and Brazil. Slaves were taken from the Igbo lands to the east and from conquered Yoruba towns, as well as from areas further to the north, and were traded for cloth and other goods.

Ilorin continued to expand southward until it was checked in the 1830s by the growing power of Ibadan, an Oyo successor state. The Ilorin cavalry were ineffective in the jungle to the south, and by the 1850s Ibadan had access to guns from European traders on the coast. The capital was occupied by the Royal Niger Company in 1897 and its lands incorporated into the British colony of Northern Nigeria in 1900, although the emirate continued to perform ceremonial functions.

Rulers

Rulers of the Ilorin Emirate:

Kingmakers and sub-chiefs of Ilorin
Due to Ilorin's unique history, first as a
Yoruba outpost of the Oyo Empire, then as a Fulani vassal of the Sokoto Caliphate, it has a kingmaking tradition that is a blend of traditions taken from both sources. Whenever the throne of the emirate (which is vested in the Fulani descendants of Shehu Alimi) is vacant, the representative of each quarter in the Emirate namely; the Balogun Gambari (Hausa), the Balogun Ajikobi (Yoruba), the Balogun Fulani (Fulani) and the Balogun Alanamu (Yoruba) - along with the head of the Afonja chieftaincy family, the Mogaji Aare, and his sub-chief called the Baba Isale of Ilorin - come together to elect and install a new emir, subject to the approval of the governor of Kwara State. The longest reigning of the four Baloguns is then conferred with the Balogun Agba title, which makes him the second in command to the Emir of Ilorin. All of the Baloguns have districts which they administer on the emir's behalf.
 
There are also traditional chiefs that are each known as Daudu (or District Head). They serve as lieutenants representing the emir in towns across the Ilorin Emirate such as Afon, Bode Saadu, Ipaye and Malete, among others.

Honorary titles in the emirate
The Emirate has witnessed the conferment of honorary titles to outstanding sons of the Emirate by the current Emir. The following are titles that have been conferred;

 Waziri of Ilorin Emirate
 Turaki of Ilorin Emirate
 Zanan of Ilorin Emirate
 Dan Iyan of Ilorin Emirate
 Grand Mufti of Ilorin Emirate
 Madawaki of Ilorin
 Malami Ubandoma of Ilorin Emirate
 Tafida of Ilorin Emirate
 Shettima of Ilorin Emirate
 Mutawali of Ilorin Emirate

References

History of Nigeria
Nigerian traditional states
Emirates
Yoruba history
Ilorin
1824 establishments in Africa